Varun Kapoor is an Indian television actor known for playing Sanskaar Maheshwari in Colors TV's Swaragini - Jodein Rishton Ke Sur and Dr. Veer Malhotra in Savitri Devi College & Hospital. 

In 2022, Kapoor made his Bollywood film debut with Gangubai Kathiawadi.

Early life
Kapoor is a Gujarati who was born and brought up in Ahmedabad, Gujarat. He did his schooling from St. Kabir School, Vadodara and graduated in Electronic engineering from Sinhgad College of Engineering, Pune. He went to Bloomington for further studies.

Career
Kapoor has played the role of Varun in Kis Desh Mein Hai Meraa Dil, Neil in Tujh Sang Preet Lagai Sajna, Varun in Bayttaab Dil Kee Tamanna Hai, Shaurya in Na Aana Is Des Laado, Kabir in Humse Hai Liife, Mahish/Mahishasura in Maharakshak: Devi and Danny Vyas in Saraswatichandra.

From 2015 to 2016, he portrayed Sanskaar Maheshwari in Swaragini - Jodein Rishton Ke Sur opposite Helly Shah for which he was awarded the Best Actor Male at Golden Petal Awards 2016.

From 2017 to 2018, Kapoor played the role of Dr. Veer Malhotra in Savitri Devi College & Hospital on Colors TV opposite Swarda Thigale.

Kapoor made his Bollywood debut in the 2022 film Gangubai Kathiawadi as Ramnik Laal.

Personal life
Kapoor married Dhanya Mohan in 2013. She works with Air India.

Filmography

Films

Television

Music videos

Awards and nominations

References

External links
 

Indian male television actors
Living people
21st-century Indian male actors
Male actors in Hindi television
Male actors from Ahmedabad
Gujarati people
People from Ahmedabad
Year of birth missing (living people)